Pronto Monto is the third album by Kate & Anna McGarrigle, released in 1978. The title is an approximate pronunciation of the French phrase "prends ton manteau", which means "take your coat".

Pronto Monto was produced with a pop polish in order to give it more radio airplay. However, the album did not meet sales expectations, and the sisters were dropped from Warner Bros. Records soon afterward.

For a long time, this was the only McGarrigle sisters album that had never been released on CD, although "NaCl (Sodium Chloride)" would reappear on the Oddities album and "Pronto Monto" on their second French record Prends ton Manteau. In 2016 the album was finally released on CD by Omnivore Recordings.

Track listing
"Oh My Heart" (Anna McGarrigle, Dane Lanken) – 3:07
"Side of Fries" (Kate McGarrigle, Philippe Tatartcheff) – 3:22
"Just Another Broken Heart" (David Nichtern) – 3:33
"NaCl (Sodium Chloride)" (Kate McGarrigle) – 2:28
"Pronto Monto (Prends ton manteau)" (Kate & Anna McGarrigle, Philippe Tatartcheff) – 2:51
"Stella by Artois" (Kate McGarrigle) – 3:53
"Bundle of Sorrow, Bundle of Joy" (Anna McGarrigle) – 4:04
"Come Back Baby" (Kate McGarrigle) – 3:18
"Tryin' to Get to You" (Charlie Singleton, Rose McCoy) – 2:39
"Fixture in the Park" (Anna McGarrigle) – 3:37
"Dead Weight" (Anna McGarrigle) – 2:27
"Cover Up My Head" (William Dumaresq, Galt MacDermot) – 2:53

Personnel
 Kate and Anna McGarrigle - vocals, piano, accordion, acoustic guitar 
David Spinozza, Jeff Mironov, Jerry Donahue, Scot Lang, David Nichtern, Richard Resnicoff – guitar
Jon Sholle – electric steel guitar, F-hole guitar, acoustic guitar
Tony Levin, Gordon Edwards, Freebo, Bob Glaub, Pat Donaldson – bass
Michael Moore – double bass
Ken "Disco Stu" Pearson – keyboards
Steve Gadd, Bernard Purdie, Gary Mallaber, Grady Tate, Gary Mure – drums
Susan Evans, George Devens, Victor Feldman – percussion
Kenny Kosek – fiddle
Chaim Tannenbaum – mandolin, harmonica, backing vocals
David Woodford, Bryan Cumming – tenor saxophone
George Young – clarinet
David Campbell - string arrangements
Howard Johnson - horn arrangements

References

External links

1978 albums
Kate & Anna McGarrigle albums
Warner Records albums